Rachel Annabelle Riley  (born 11 January 1986) is a British television presenter. She co-presents the Channel 4 daytime puzzle show Countdown and its comedy spin-off 8 Out of 10 Cats Does Countdown. She is a mathematics graduate.

Her television debut came when she joined Countdown aged 22. With an interest in popularising mathematics and the sciences, she has since co-presented The Gadget Show on Channel 5 (2013–14) and It's Not Rocket Science on ITV (2016). She was also a contestant on the BBC celebrity dance show Strictly Come Dancing in 2013.

Early life and early career 

Riley was born in Rochford, Essex. She was raised in the Thorpe Bay area of Southend-on-Sea and was educated at the independent Thorpe Hall School, and Southend High School for Girls, a grammar school, where she obtained four As at A-Level. She then completed a master's degree in mathematics at the University of Oxford.

During a university holiday Riley considered a career in the financial sector and completed an internship at Deutsche Bank in the City of London. The experience put her off: she found the extreme behaviour of city traders wearing, and she disliked the early-morning train commute.

Television career

Countdown
On Countdown, Riley replaced the long-serving Carol Vorderman. Like Vorderman, Riley's role is to handle the placement of tiles on the board for the letters and numbers rounds and to find an exact solution in the numbers rounds if the contestants are unable to do so. Riley's appointment to Countdown was announced at the same time as the announcement of a new main host, Jeff Stelling, replacing Des O'Connor; the duo of Stelling and Riley was in place for the new series beginning in January 2009. Although she had no ambition to be a television presenter, she was encouraged to apply by her mother, and decided to do so because she was interested in the numbers part of the game. Having beaten 1,000 applicants for the role, she commented, "There's only one cool maths job around and I was lucky enough to get it so I'm absolutely thrilled".

Since it was first broadcast on 2 January 2012, Riley has also performed her Countdown role on the comedy crossover spin-off version, 8 Out of 10 Cats Does Countdown, alongside comedian Jimmy Carr as host. While Countdown is seen as a straight light entertainment show, in explaining the difference between the two, Riley sees Countdown as the role she is happy for her grandmother to see, while Cats Does Countdown is the more risqué, cheeky role which she shows to her friends.

Strictly Come Dancing
From September 2013, Riley appeared in the eleventh series of the BBC One ballroom dancing programme Strictly Come Dancing with professional dancing partner Pasha Kovalev. She was eliminated in week 6 of the show, on 3 November, after losing out in the dance-off against Abbey Clancy and Aljaž Škorjanec, who went on to win the series.

According to Riley she lacked a natural talent for performing, so instead sought to frame each dance as that of a character. For the first five weeks, Riley suffered from stage fright, commenting that "As soon as the music would start, I would have a fuzzy brain and it was like an out-of-body experience"; after seeing a cognitive behavioural therapist she was able to control her breathing, and so was only able to truly enjoy the show for what proved to be her final appearance.

Other work
From 2013 to 2014, Riley co-presented on the Channel 5 programme The Gadget Show with Jason Bradbury. She presented three series of the show and was later replaced by Amy Williams. In 2016, Riley was part of the three-person presenting team for ITV's six-part series, It's Not Rocket Science, billed by the network as an entertainment series celebrating science. Her co-presenters, Ben Miller and Romesh Ranganathan, similarly had a background in science and maths.

In August 2016, it was announced that Riley had joined Sky Sports to present Friday Night Football alongside her former Countdown co-presenter Jeff Stelling, and Fantasy Football Club with Max Rushden and Paul Merson. She left Friday Night Football in 2017.

Personal life 
In August 2012, Riley married Jamie Gilbert, whom she had met while they were both studying at the University of Oxford. It was announced in November 2013 that they were separating. The split has been cited as an example of the Strictly curse. She began dating her Strictly dance partner, Pasha Kovalev, soon after the show ended in December 2013. In May 2019, Riley announced that she was pregnant with the couple's first child. On 28 June 2019, Riley and Kovalev married in Las Vegas. On 15 December 2019, Riley gave birth to a baby girl. In April 2021, Riley announced that she was pregnant with the couple's second child. On 5 November 2021, Riley gave birth to their second daughter.

Riley is a keen supporter of Manchester United, like her father who was originally from Salford; in October 2010, Riley presented a programme on the club's television channel MUTV that featured a tour of their Trafford Training Centre in Carrington. She has also hosted episodes of An Audience with... on the channel. To mark her 1,000th episode of Countdown (aired on 25 June 2013), United player Ryan Giggs presented her with a signed team shirt, Giggs himself having celebrated his 1,000th game for the club the same year. In her appearance as a contestant on the BBC quiz show Celebrity Mastermind, broadcast on 4 January 2012, her specialist subject was a limited (13-year) history of the club; she eventually finished in joint second place.

In 2017, she was the co-winner with Idris Elba of the Rear of the Year award.

Riley’s mother is Jewish. She stated that, "My family came over in the pogroms" from Tsarist Russia. She is an atheist.

Campaign against antisemitism
In 2018, Riley began a campaign against the way the Labour Party under the leadership of Jeremy Corbyn had handled allegations of antisemitism. She said she decided to speak out after seeing "Israel is a racist endeavour" posters on London bus stops. In September 2018, after criticising Corbyn over the ongoing antisemitism row, she stated she did not have "any party loyalties". In January 2019, Riley made a speech at a Westminster reception for the Holocaust Educational Trust and addressed what she described as the "hideous abuse" she had received.

In Jewish News, Riley was quoted:In the name of Labour I've been called a hypocrite, lying propagandist, a tits-teeth-and-arse clothes horse dolly bird, weaponiser of anti-Semitism, fascist, right-wing extremist, Nazi sympathiser, Twitter cancer, thick Tory, brainwashed, an anti-Semite, white supremacist, hate preacher, Zio political trollster, not a real Jew, a child bully, conspiracy theorist, a paedo-protector minion puppet who my dead grandfather would be disgusted by.

In February 2019, according to The Times and i, Riley had been involved in talks to set up a centrist breakaway party from Labour. According to Jewish News in April, Riley backed the Stop Funding Fake News campaign. In November 2019, Riley posted an image on Twitter of herself wearing a shirt with an edited image of Corbyn carrying a sign bearing the caption "Jeremy Corbyn is a racist endeavour". The tweet was condemned by some for erasing the struggle against the apartheid regime in South Africa, the original subject of the sign, to make a political point, with some users calling for Riley to be fired. The professional photographer who took the original shot, Rob Scott, also declared his displeasure, stating she had "illegally manipulated and printed" the picture to "cynically promote her agenda", adding "I am appalled by the abuse of property, moral rights and change of anti-racist message to anti-Corbyn one."

In February 2019, Riley and fellow campaigner Tracy-Ann Oberman instructed a lawyer to take action against 70 individuals who had posted tweets which Riley and Oberman regarded as either libellous or harassment. As a result, Riley and Oberman sued one person who had retweeted a link to an article which had accused Oberman and Riley of harassing a young Labour activist who had commented on antisemitism in the Labour Party. In May 2019, a High Court judge ruled that the article that was linked in the tweet was defamatory. In July 2020, Riley and Oberman dropped their joint libel suit and contributed towards the defendant's legal costs.

In 2021 Riley was awarded £10,000 damages by a High Court judge after suing  Laura Murray, then an aide of Corbyn, over comments made on Twitter.

On 16 November 2022, Riley was awarded £50,000 in damages after a libel action against Michael Sivier, a blogger who had accused Riley of abusing a teenager during a 2019 Twitter discussion. Sivier had previously been found guilty of 3 of the 4 charges against him before the UK Court of Appeals ordered a review of them; the High Court's decision confirmed both Sivier's guilt and his reparation judgment for Riley.

Riley was appointed Member of the Order of the British Empire (MBE) in the 2023 New Year Honours for services to Holocaust education.

Other work 
Riley has visited schools to enthuse pupils on the "joys of applied maths, quantum mechanics and time travel and so on".

In June 2019, Riley was criticised by environmental groups and accused of greenwashing for her promotion of the "future energy solutions" of Shell, an oil and gas company.

She is listed on the website of the Center for Countering Digital Hate (CCDH) as a patron. She participated in an April 2022 study by the CCDH, which found that Instagram failed to act on 90% of abusive direct messages sent to high-profile women.

In October 2021, Riley published her first book, At Sixes and Sevens: How to Understand Numbers and Make Maths Easy.

Filmography

Television

Guest appearances

Chris Moyles' Quiz Night (22 March 2009)
This Morning (26 March 2010)
8 Out of 10 Cats (17 June 2011, 12 August 2011, 21 October 2011, 23 March 2012, 11 May 2012, 15 June 2012, 29 October 2012, 1 February 2013)
Celebrity Mastermind (4 January 2012)
The Bank Job: Celebrity Special (16 March 2012)
The Chase: Celebrity Special (19 August 2012, 8 June 2018)
12 Again (2 November 2012)
Pointless Celebrities (17 December 2012)
Sunday Brunch (10 February 2013)
Five Minutes to a Fortune (21 April 2013)
Tipping Point: Lucky Stars (9 June 2013)
Top Gear (30 June 2013)
I Love My Country (31 August 2013)
Sweat the Small Stuff (12 November 2013)
Who Wants to Be a Millionaire? (4 February 2014)
The Guess List (24 May 2014)
Backchat (3 June 2014)
TV OD (19 June 2014)
Celebrity Fifteen to One (27 June 2014)
Virtually Famous (21 July 2014)
Celebrity Squares (8 October 2014)
Text Santa (19 December 2014)
Would I Lie to You? (22 December 2014)
Room 101 (18 February 2015)
Dara O Briain's Go 8 Bit  (26 September 2016)
Saturday Kitchen (3 December 2016)
Play to the Whistle (28 February 2017)
Through the Keyhole (3 February 2018)
The Crystal Maze (22 June 2018)
Richard Osman's House of Games (12-16 November 2018)
Michael McIntyre's The Wheel (9 January 2021)
Celebrity Antiques Road Trip (9 November 2021)
Saturday Kitchen Rosh Hashanah Special (24 September 2022)

She has also made brief appearances in Dispatches, Britain's Brightest and 1001 Things You Should Know.

Recognition 

 "For services to Holocaust Education", Riley was awarded an MBE in the 2023 New Year Honours.

References

External links 

 

1986 births
Living people
Activists against antisemitism
Alumni of Oriel College, Oxford
English atheists
English Jews
English television presenters
Countdown (game show)
Jewish atheists
People educated at Southend High School for Girls
People from Rochford
People from Southend-on-Sea
Secular Jews
Television personalities from Essex
Members of the Order of the British Empire